Mount McCarthy is a peak,  high, standing  northwest of Schofield Peak, in the Barker Range, Victoria Land, Antarctica. It was named by the New Zealand Federated Mountain Clubs Antarctic Expedition (NZFMCAE), 1962–63, after Mortimer McCarthy, a member of the crew of the Terra Nova of the British Antarctic Expedition, 1910–13. McCarthy was a guest of the U.S. Navy during the 1962–63 season when he revisited McMurdo Sound with two other Scott veterans.

References

Mountains of Victoria Land
Pennell Coast